The 1949 FIVB Men's World Championship was the first edition of the tournament, organised by the world's governing body, the FIVB. It was held from 10 to 18 September 1949 in Prague, Czechoslovakia.

Teams

 and  refused to participate

Results

First round

Pool A

|}

|}

Pool B

|}

|}

Pool C

|}

|}

Final round

7th–10th places

|}

|}

1st–6th places

|}

|}

Final standing

External links
 Results at FIVB.org

W
FIVB Men's World Championship
V
FIVB Volleyball Men's World Championship
Sports competitions in Prague
FIVB Volleyball Men's World Championship
FIVB Volleyball Men's World Championship, 1949